The Boston mayoral election of 1872 saw the election of Henry L. Pierce, who narrowly unseated incumbent mayor William Gaston.

Results

See also
List of mayors of Boston, Massachusetts

References

Mayoral elections in Boston
Boston
Boston mayoral
19th century in Boston